Kulno  is a village in the administrative district of Gmina Kuryłówka, within Leżajsk County, Subcarpathian Voivodeship, in south-eastern Poland. The Złota stream flows through the village.

The village has a population of 600.

References

Kulno